Kashif Hussain Khan Tareen (born 19 October 1965) is a United Arab Emirati cricketer. He played First-class cricket and List A cricket for the United Arab Emirates national cricket team from 1989/90 to 2007 and from 1989/90 to 1993/94.

References

External links
 

1965 births
Living people